ZFOOTBALL is a national 4-on-4 flag football tour which holds events across the United States. ZFOOTBALL tournaments include men's divisions and youth divisions, which are separated by skill and age respectively.

The game
The official field is 25 yards wide and 64 yards long. Each end zone is seven yards deep. Games consist of two fourteen-minute halves. Teams have one time-out per game, which stops the clock. In the last minute of the game, if the difference in score is less than 10 points, a pro clock is used (stoppage on out of bounds, incomplete passes, defensive penalties, and scores). Teams have four players each on the field, and can have rosters of up to six players. Substitutions are unlimited, and can be made between plays.

Offense
The offensive team begins their possession at the five-yard line, and has three plays to gain 20 yards and advance the ball beyond mid-field. After they advance the ball past mid-field, the offense has three additional plays to put the ball into the end-zone. If a team scores a Touchdown (six points), they have the option of attempting either a one-point conversion (from five yards) or a two-point conversion (from twelve yards).

The offense advances the ball by completing forward passes. Passes must be completed over the line of scrimmage line. No backwards laterals, screen passes behind the line of scrimmage, or downfield pitches are allowed. The offense also has the option of running the ball to gain yardage, but a hand-off must occur behind the line of scrimmage in order for the offense to gain the run option.

Defense
The goal of the defense is to stop the opposing offensive unit from scoring. Before each play, one of the referees will mark off seven yards from the line of scrimmage, and the defense has the option to rush the quarterback from the seven yard mark after the ball is snapped. The defense is allowed to rush immediately (even if they are not seven yards back) if the offense hands the ball off.

Tournament Format
Teams are separated into groups of four, and take part in round-robin play, with the top two teams from each group advancing into the single-elimination round.

In 2005, ZFOOTBALL awarded the largest cash prize in the history of flag football -- $25,000—to the national champion, M.O.B. (Miami, Florida).

External links
Play Flag Football website
Zfootball Rules

Flag football